Pavel Londak (born 14 May 1980) is an Estonian professional footballer who plays as a goalkeeper for Legion.

Londak spent most of his career playing in Estonia and Norway. He won the 2016 Tippeligaen with Rosenborg.

International career
Londak made his international debut for Estonia on 4 July 2001, in a 2–5 defeat to Lithuania in a 2001 Baltic Cup match.

Personal
Londak was born Pavel Kisseljov. He changed his surname to Londak in 2003.

Career statistics

Club

Honours

Club
Flora
Estonian Supercup: 2002

Rosenborg
Tippeligaen: 2016
Norwegian Football Cup: 2016

Nõmme Kalju
Meistriliiga: 2018
Estonian Supercup: 2019

References

External links

Pavel Londak profile at Altomfotball

1980 births
Living people
Footballers from Tallinn
Estonian people of Russian descent
Viljandi JK Tulevik players
FC Valga players
Paide Linnameeskond players
FC Elva players
FC Flora players
FC Lantana Tallinn players
FK Bodø/Glimt players
Rosenborg BK players
Estonian footballers
Estonia international footballers
Estonia under-21 international footballers
Estonian expatriate footballers
Expatriate footballers in Norway
Estonian expatriate sportspeople in Norway
Esiliiga players
Meistriliiga players
Eliteserien players
Norwegian First Division players
Expatriate footballers in Turkey
Estonian expatriate sportspeople in Turkey
Süper Lig players
Association football goalkeepers
Tallinna JK Legion players
JK Tervis Pärnu players
Nõmme Kalju FC players